Gray Hawk is a small, unincorporated community in eastern Jackson County, KY. The community is located along US Route 421. Services in the community include a post office, gas station, and restaurant. Gray Hawk has a community park and two waterfalls: McCammon Branch Falls and Flat Lick Falls.

The Gray Haw Post Office was established in 1853 and remains open to this day. The origins of the name Gray Hawk remain unclear. It could have been named for the many gray colored hawks seen in the area, or its namesakes could be the original landholding Gray and Hawk families.

References

Unincorporated communities in Jackson County, Kentucky
Unincorporated communities in Kentucky